Club Atletico Saint Louis is an American soccer team based in St. Louis, Missouri. It plays within the National Premier Soccer League (NPSL), a national amateur league at the fourth tier of the American Soccer Pyramid, in the South Region's Heartland Conference.

History
Originally founded as a youth clinic in 2016, Saint Louis Club Atletico was announced as the National Premier Soccer League's newest expansion team on January 3, 2018, with plans to begin play in the league's upcoming 2018 season in the Heartland Conference. The team announced it would be playing home matches at St. Mary's Stadium in South St. Louis.

Saint Louis played its inaugural game on May 12 on the road against NPSL powerhouse FC Wichita. Despite taking an early lead, the team lost, 4–2, with Chevaughn Walsh scoring the first two goals in team history in the 3rd and 21st minutes respectively. One week later Atletico played its first home match on May 19 against Ozark FC, drawing the visitors 1–1 at St. Mary's High School with Walsh scoring his third goal of the season.

Saint Louis finished the regular season fourth in the Heartland Conference with a record of 5-1-4 (16 pts), enough to earn the team a spot in the conference's playoff tournament. On July 11, Atletico lost, 4–0, on the road in a rematch of the season opener to top seed and defending conference champion FC Wichita.

Ahead of its sophomore season, the team underwent a minor re-branding and began to play under the name Club Atletico Saint Louis.

Record

Year-by-year

Logo history

Notable players
 Hamza Elias
 Kaleb Jackson
 Chevaughn Walsh
  Anthony Brown 
 Jair Hernandez

References

National Premier Soccer League teams
Soccer clubs in St. Louis
Association football clubs established in 2018
2018 establishments in Missouri